Communal may refer to:
A commune or also intentional community
 Communalism (Bookchin)
 Communalism (South Asia), the South Asian sectarian ideologies
Relating to an administrative division called comune
Sociality in animals
Community ownership

See also 

 Communalism (disambiguation)